Palaeonympha is a monotypic butterfly genus of the subfamily Satyrinae in the family Nymphalidae. Its one species, Palaeonympha opalina, is found in Taiwan and China.

The larvae of subspecies macrophthalmia feed on Lophatherum gracile, Oplismenus undulatifolius (including var. microphyllus) and Miscanthus sinensis.

Subspecies
Palaeonympha opalina opalina (China: Shaanxi, Hupei)
Palaeonympha opalina macrophthalmia Fruhstorfer, 1911 (Taiwan)
Palaeonympha opalina bailiensis Yoshino, 2001 (China: northern Yunnan)

References

Euptychiina
Monotypic butterfly genera
Taxa named by Arthur Gardiner Butler